Capital Fort Business Center is a Class A office building in Sofia. The height is 126 m, and was the tallest building in Bulgaria before the construction of Sky Fort with its 202 m. The building has two underground floors which serve as parking lots for around 750 cars.

Location 
The building is located on Tsarigradsko shose, one of the largest and busiest boulevards in Sofia. Together with Sky Fort, they form Sofia Capital City - a cluster of high-rise buildings. The area is serviced by bus lines and the Tsarigradsko shose Metro Station of Sofia Metro.

Design and construction
The concept design of Capital Fort is done by WKK whilst working at Atkins. The local architect of record is "A&A Architects", Sofia, Bulgaria, who have worked on most of the Business Park Sofia buildings. Atkins is the architecture company behind Burj Al Arab in Dubai and as a result Capital Fort shares most of the external looks with its distinctive predecessor (itself completed in 1999). Capital Fort is developed by Fort Noks, the company behind 500 000 m² built-up area of Black Sea resort developments in the last decade. Construction began on 29.01.2010 and the edifice was topped out by 2012. Estimated value was between €60 and €80 million.

Interior
This mixed use building (Office, Retail & Conference Facility) comprises a high-rise office building and a L-shaped low-rise office building that both sit over a podium, which houses a wide range of retail and conference facilities, accessed through a grand atrium lobby. Offices use 24 of building's floors. Superior equipment and installations include 12 high-speed lifts in the high body, advanced HVAC technology and a building management system, covering climate control, security, fire protection and safety.

Class A
Building Owners and Managers Association (BOMA) defines three categories of office buildings - namely Class A, Class B, and Class C. Since the number of parking spaces is 717, Capital Fort does not cover the standard for a Class A office building. Requirement is a parking space for each 100 m² of gross floor area (GFA)  The gross floor area of the building is 80 795 m², which requires 808 parking spaces for Class A - 91 more than the currently available ones. Other source points out just 40 000 m² of (probable) GFA, since "efficient open-space" of 1 150 m² a floor (cited there as well) gives a total of 32 200 m², in which case Capital Fort covers Class A requirements, regarding parking spaces. The building is not purely an office one, having retail and conference functions as well.

See also
List of tallest buildings in Sofia
List of tallest buildings in Bulgaria
List of tallest structures in Bulgaria
List of tallest buildings in Europe
List of tallest buildings in the European Union

Notes

External links
Official site
List of tallest buildings in Sofia
Photos from construction (comments in Bulgarian)

Skyscrapers in Sofia
Skyscraper office buildings
Office buildings in Bulgaria
Retail buildings in Bulgaria
Office buildings completed in 2015